The Central Financial Commission (CFC) is a commission of the Chinese Communist Party (CCP) in the process of establishment that will supervise and manage the Chinese financial system.

History 
The CFC was established in 2023 under CCP general secretary Xi Jinping after wide-ranging reforms to change the Party and state structure, together with the Central Financial Work Commission. According to Chinese state media, the new body would strengthen the CCP's "centralized and unified leadership over financial work".

The CFC will oversee the dissolution of the  Financial Stability and Development Committee, a State Council body established in 2017.

Role 
The CFC's role would be to broadly oversee the country's financial system, enhancing party control over the sector.

References 

Institutions of the Central Committee of the Chinese Communist Party
2023 establishments in China
Government finances in China